Tiffany Singh (born 1978) is a New Zealand artist.

Background 
Singh was born in 1978 in Auckland, New Zealand and is of Indian and Pacific descent. She graduated from the Elam School of Fine Arts in 2008.

Career 
Singh is an installation artist that explores community outreach and cultural preservation. Her work Fly Me Up To Where You Are received an award in 2013 from the Human Rights Commission.

In 2017 Singh received the New Generation Award from the Arts Foundation of New Zealand.

Singh has received residencies at the Taiwan Artists Village (2017, from Asia New Zealand Foundation), Montalvo Arts Centre (2013, California), and McCahon House Residency (2014, Titirangi).

Singh is represented by the Melanie Roger Gallery.

Exhibitions 

 2017, The Journey of a Million Miles Begins with One Step, Headland Sculpture on the Gulf, Waiheke Island
 2017, The Singing Raintree, Splore Festival, Auckland
 2012, The Chinese Horoscope Show, Enjoy Public Art Gallery, Wellington (group show)
 2012, 18th Biennale of Sydney (group show)
 2011, Medi(t)ation: Contemporary Asian Art Biennial, National Taiwan Museum of Fine Arts (group show)
 2011, Know on the Sky Listen to the Sound, Enjoy Public Art Gallery, Wellington
 2011, Preserve, Papakura Art Gallery (group show)
 2011, Stealing the Senses, Govett-Brewster Art Gallery, New Plymouth (group show)
 2010, Knowing Me, Knowing You, Artspace, Auckland (group show)

References

Further reading 
Artist files for Tiffany Singh are held at:
 Angela Morton Collection, Takapuna Library
 E. H. McCormick Research Library, Auckland Art Gallery Toi o Tāmaki
 Fine Arts Library, University of Auckland
 Te Aka Matua Research Library, Museum of New Zealand Te Papa Tongarewa

Contribution to education 
The partnership project between Singh and the Auckland Resettled Community Coalition (ARCC), The Journey of a Million Miles Begins with One Step (exhibited as part of Headland Sculpture on the Gulf, 2017) contributed to a research project on learning 'in' intense environments and less distinct educational settings led by Dr Sarah Healy from The University of Melbourne, Australia. The following peer-reviewed publications feature the significant contribution to knowledge about response-able pedagogy made possible by Tiffany Singh's involvement:

 Sarah Healy & Dianne Mulcahy (2021) Pedagogic affect: assembling an affirming ethics, Pedagogy, Culture & Society, 29:4, 555-572, https://doi.org/10.1080/14681366.2020.1768581
 Dianne Mulcahy & Sarah Healy (2021) Ordinary affect and its powers: assembling pedagogies of response-ability, Pedagogy, Culture & Society, https://doi.org/10.1080/14681366.2021.1950201
 Sarah Healy (2019) Cracking open pedagogy: Learning 'in' intense environments [PhD Thesis, The University of Melbourne] http://hdl.handle.net/11343/230614

Living people
1978 births
Elam Art School alumni
New Zealand women artists